Terence Stephen "Terry" Morrall (born 24 November 1938) is an English former footballer, who played as a defender. He was a part of the Aston Villa squad which won the Football League Second Division in the 1959–60 season.

Career
Morrall started his career with Aston Villa, coming up through their youth system. He appeared 3 times in their 1959–60 season where they won the Second Division, and appeared once in the first ever staging of the League Cup in which Aston Villa ultimately became the inaugural champions. However, he left Aston Villa at the end of the 1960–61 season

He would move to Shrewsbury Town, Wrexham and Southport in the league over the next few years, however in 1966 he would move to non-league football with Stourbridge.

Honours
Aston Villa
Football League Second Division: 1959–60
League Cup: 1960–61

References

Living people
1938 births
English Football League players
Aston Villa F.C. players
Shrewsbury Town F.C. players
Wrexham A.F.C. players
Southport F.C. players
Stourbridge F.C. players
Association football defenders
English footballers